Darvadstrocel, sold under the brand name Alofisel, is a medication used to treat complex perianal fistulas in adults with non-active/mildly active luminal Crohn's disease, when fistulas have shown an inadequate response to at least one conventional or biologic therapy. It contains mesenchymal stem cells from fat tissue of adult donors.

It was approved for use in the European Union in March 2018. The approval was spearheaded by data published in the ADMIRE-CD trial.

It was approved for use in Japan by Japan's Ministry of Health, Labour and Welfare (MHLW) in September 2021.

Medical use 
Darvadstrocel has been approved by the European Union for the treatment of adults with complex Crohn's perianal fistulas after conventional or biological medications have not worked.

Mechanism of action 
Darvadstrocel works by reducing inflammation and facilitating the growth of tissue in the fistula tract.

History

ADMIRE-CD 
The ADMIRE-CD trial was a phase III trial that assessed the safety and efficacy of darvadstrocel vs. placebo in adults with complex perianal fistulas with Crohn's disease. The study randomized a total of 212 patients. 107 patients were given darvadstrocel and 105 patients were given placebo.

After one year, the study found darvadstrocel to be effective in closing external fistula openings, compared to placebo. Patients taking darvadstrocel had a combined remission of 56.3% and clinical remission of 59.2%. The placebo controls had a combined remission of 38.6% and clinical remission of 41.6%.

INSPECT 
Published in 2022, the INSPECT study is a retrospective study that evaluated the long-term effectiveness and safety of darvadstrocel in patients with perianal fistulas in Crohn's disease that were treated in the ADMIRE-CD trial. The study data showed that darvadstrocel or the maintenance treatment used can have long term clinical remission in patients.

References

Further reading

External links 

Orphan drugs